Martin Landau (1928–2017) was an American film and television actor. On television, Landau's most notable roles were that of Rollin Hand in Mission: Impossible (1966–1969) and as Commander John Koenig in the science fiction series Space: 1999 (1975–1977). On film, Landau appeared in notable films such as North by Northwest (1959), Tucker: The Man and His Dream (1988) and Crimes and Misdemeanors (1989).

Landau won an Academy Award for Best Supporting Actor for his role as Bela Lugosi in Tim Burton's Ed Wood (1994).

Filmography

Films

Television

Notes

References

External links

Male actor filmographies
American filmographies